Karl Curtis George (April 26, 1913 – May 1978) was an American jazz trumpeter. He was born in St. Louis, Missouri.

Career 
Early in his career, George played with McKinney's Cotton Pickers (1933) and Cecil Lee. Later in the 1930s he spent time in the Jeter-Pillars Orchestra and then in the orchestras of Teddy Wilson (1939–1940) and Lionel Hampton (1941–42). He served in the United States Army in 1942 and 1943, then moved to California and played with Stan Kenton (1943), Benny Carter (1944), Count Basie (1945), and Happy Johnson (1946). He led his own group on record in 1945 and 1946, and played in sessions led by Charles Mingus, Slim Gaillard, Oscar Pettiford, Dinah Washington, and Lucky Thompson.

Personal life 
George retired from music after the late-1940s due to ill health. He died in 1978.

Discography
With Count Basie
 The Original American Decca Recordings (GRP, 1992)

With Stan Kenton
 Stan Kenton's Milestones (Capitol, 1950)
 Stan Kenton Classics (Capitol, 1952)
 The Kenton Era (Capitol, 1955)

With Dinah Washington
 Mellow Mama (Delmark, 1992)

References
Footnotes

General references
Leonard Feather and Ira Gitler, The Biographical Encyclopedia of Music. Oxford, 1999, p. 251.

American jazz trumpeters
American male trumpeters
Jazz musicians from Missouri
Musicians from St. Louis
1913 births
1978 deaths
20th-century American musicians
20th-century trumpeters
20th-century American male musicians
American male jazz musicians